Grady is a three-episode British television series which aired in 1970. It was a drama written by Edmund Ward and produced by Marc Miller for Yorkshire Television. The series starred Anthony Bate in the title role as a trade-union negotiator in a northern factory.

Halliwell's Television Companion praised the star and the script: "Anthony Bate rides into town like an old-time gunfighter as a modern hero of labour, a shop-floor loner interested only in a bigger share of loot for the workers, contemptuous of all ideologues. One of television's more successful attempts to wrest drama from the industrial 1970s, and certainly the first to imbue it with the values of the Wild West of the 1870s."

Despite the wiping that was common among British broadcasters during the 1970s, the series still exists in the archives.

References

Bibliography

Halliwell, Leslie; with Philip Purser, 1985. Halliwell's Television Companion, 3rd edition. London, Paladin Books.

External links
Grady on IMDb

1970 British television series debuts
1970 British television series endings
1970s British drama television series
English-language television shows
ITV television dramas